= Serb National Guard of Kotor =

The Serb National Guard of Kotor (Serbian Latin: Srpska narodna garda Kotora, Cyrillic: Српска народна гарда Которa) was an armed Serb institution in the Gulf of Kotor, founded in 1862. It existed for over 50 years.
